The National University of Saint Augustine, known locally as Universidad Nacional de San Agustín (U.N.S.A.) is a public university in Arequipa, Peru. The National University of Saint Augustine has been consistently ranked as one of the top public schools in Peru and it is one of the oldest public universities in Latin America with continuous operation since its founding on November 11, 1828.

The university comprises three campuses, 17 colleges, and 45 professional schools from the fields of humanities, natural sciences, biological, social sciences and engineering.

Colleges and professional schools 

Arequipa's principal stadium — one of the largest in Peru, Estadio de la UNSA — was built by the university.

See also
 Official website
 List of universities in Peru

References

 (in Spanish)

External links
 Universidad Nacional de San Agustín de Arequipa website

Educational institutions established in 1828
National University of Saint Augustine